Teofilo Francisco Gonzalez Arce (born January 26, 1948 in Monterrey, Mexico) is a Mexican-American computer scientist who is professor emeritus of computer science at the University of California, Santa Barbara. 

In 1972, Gonzalez was one of the first students who earned a bachelor's degree in computer science (Ingeniero en Sistemas Computacionales) in Mexico, at the Monterrey Institute of Technology and Higher Education.
He completed his Ph.D. in 1975 from the University of Minnesota under the supervision of  Sartaj Sahni. He taught at the University of Oklahoma from 1975 to 1976, at the Pennsylvania State University from 1976 to 1979, at the Monterrey Institute of Technology and Higher Education from 1979 to 1980, and at the University of Texas at Dallas from 1980 to 1984, before joining the UCSB computer science faculty in 1984. He spent Sabbatical Leaves at Utrecht University (1990) in the Netherlands and the Monterrey Institute of Technology and Higher Education. Professor Gonzalez became a Fellow of IASTED in 2009.

Gonzalez is known for his highly cited pioneering research in the hardness of approximation; for his sub-linear and best possible approximation algorithm (unless P = NP) based on the farthest-first traversal for the metric k-center problem (k-tMM clustering); and for introducing the open-shop scheduling problem as well as algorithms for its solution that have found numerous applications in several research areas as well as for his research on  flow shop scheduling, and job shop scheduling algorithms. He is the editor of the Handbook on Approximation Algorithms and Metaheuristics first edition, second edition  and he is co-editor of Volume 1 (Computer Science and Software Engineering) of the Computing Handbook Set.

Selected publications

References

External links
Home page
Google scholar profile

1948 births
Living people
Monterrey Institute of Technology and Higher Education alumni
University of Minnesota College of Science and Engineering alumni
American academics of Mexican descent
Mexican emigrants to the United States
American computer scientists
Mexican computer scientists
Theoretical computer scientists
University of Oklahoma faculty
Pennsylvania State University faculty
Academic staff of the Monterrey Institute of Technology and Higher Education
University of Texas at Dallas faculty
University of California, Santa Barbara faculty